Eustalomyia is a genus of root-maggot flies in the family Anthomyiidae. There are about five described species in Eustalomyia. They are kleptoparasites that consume paralyzed prey meant for Crabronidae larvae.

Species
These five species belong to the genus Eustalomyia:
E. festiva (Zetterstedt, 1845) i c g
E. hilaris (Fallén, 1823) c g
E. histrio (Zetterstedt, 1838) i c g
E. lepraota Séguy, 1928 c g
E. vittipes (Zetterstedt, 1845) i c g
Data sources: i = ITIS, c = Catalogue of Life, g = GBIF, b = Bugguide.net

References

Further reading

External links

 

Anthomyiidae
Articles created by Qbugbot
Schizophora genera